Kazumasa Sasaki (佐々木一正; born December 11, 1989), is a Japanese professional ice hockey Defenceman currently playing for the Oji Eagles of the Asia League.

Since 2009 he plays for the Oji Eagles. He previously played for the Östersund/Brunflo IF in the Hockeyettan, the third-tier league in Sweden. He also has played for the Japan national team since the year 2012.

References

Oji Eagle's players profile

1989 births
People from Tomakomai, Hokkaido
Japanese ice hockey defencemen
Living people
Sportspeople from Hokkaido
Oji Eagles players